Burgeo-La Poile is a provincial electoral district for the House of Assembly of Newfoundland and Labrador, Canada. As of 2011, there are 7,527 eligible voters living within the district. The district was first created when Newfoundland joined confederation in 1949 as Burgeo and La Poile, and existed until 1975. It was recreated in 1995 following a reduction in the number of seats in the House of Assembly from 52 to 48, forming from the amalgamation of the former districts of La Poile and Burgeo-Bay D'Espoir.

The district takes in the southwestern corner of Newfoundland, stretching from the town of Burgeo in the east to Cape Ray in the west. Its largest community, Port aux Basques, is the island's link to continental North America through the Marine Atlantic ferry service.

The population in the region dropped by about 15 per cent between 1996 and 2001. The size of the district grew significantly in the 2007 redistribution as the eastern border pushed out an extra 37 kilometers.

The district is one of the strongest Liberal regions of the province, and was one of only three districts to return a Liberal MHA in the 2007 election. The district contains intra-provincial ferries servicing Grey River, Ramea, and La Poile.

Geography
The district includes the part of the province of Newfoundland and Labrador bounded as follows:
Beginning at the point of intersection with the Meridian of 57 degrees West Longitude and the shoreline of the southwest coast, located east of the community of Grey River; Thence running due north along the Meridian of 57 degrees West Longitude to its intersection with the Parallel of 48 degrees 30 minutes North Latitude; Thence running west along the Parallel of 48 degrees 30 minutes North Latitude to its intersection with the Meridian of 58 degrees West Longitude; Thence running in a southwesterly direction to the point of land known as Red Rocks, located on the eastern shoreline of Cabot Strait, north of Cape Ray; Thence running in a general easterly direction along the sinuosities of the southwest coast to the point of beginning, together with Burgeo Island, the Ramea Islands and all other islands adjacent thereto.

All geographic coordinates being scaled and referenced to the Universal Transverse Mercator Map Projection and the North American Datum of 1983.

Federal riding
The provincial boundary of this district falls within the federal district of Long Range Mountains.

Communities

Members of the House of Assembly

District of Burgeo-Lapoile

Former District of Lapoile

Former District of Burgeo-Bay D'Espoir

Election results

|}

|}

|}

|}

|}

As District of La Poile

|}

As District of Burgeo-Bay d'Espoir

|}

References

External links
Newfoundland and Labrador House of Assembly

Newfoundland and Labrador provincial electoral districts